The Kansas Department of Health and Environment is a state agency in Kansas, responsible for the state's public health system, medical records, and environmental sustainability.

References

External links
 
Department of Health & Environment publications available at State Library of Kansas' KGI Online Library
Early history of KDHE's predecessor, Kansas State Board of Health State Library of Kansas' KGI Online Library

Aging and Disability Services
State departments of health of the United States